The 1953 season was the Chicago Bears' 34th in the National Football League. The team failed to improve on their 5–7 record from 1952 and finished at 3–8–1 under head coach and owner George Halas, fourth place in the NFL's newly formed Western Conference. In the season finale, the Bears lost to the crosstown Cardinals, who were previously winless.

Regular season

Schedule

Standings

References 

Chicago Bears
Chicago Bears seasons
Chicago Bears